Let's Fight Ghost is a 2021 Thai romantic-action fantasy drama television series adaptation / remake of the 2016 South Korean series Bring It On, Ghost.

It's the 5th work of True CJ Creations Company, a joint venture between the South Korean CJ E&M and the True Corporation of Thailand.

Synopsis 
The story revolves around Off Issawa (Suppapong Udomkaewkanjana), a medical student, who has grown up with the ability to see ghosts. He uses his power to work as an exorcist, banishing ghosts in order to make enough money to undergo a procedure that will take his ability away. At a haunted girls' high school, he encounters Jeen Jidapa (Patchanan Jiajirachote), an amnesiac ghost, who wants to get rid of another ghost.

Initially, Off thinks it is Jeen who needs to be banished, but after a brief fight, which ends up with Off accidentally kissing Jeen, she starts to remember a part of her past. Jeen can also see the vulnerable spot of their adversaries and how they ended up being ghosts.

However, Off and Jeen are unaware that they are being stalked by an evil spirit that caused problem for both.

Cast

Production 
The filming of Let's Fight, Ghost took 1 year and 6 months to complete, starting fitting in mid-August 2019. Shooting started in September 2019, but due to the COVID-19 situation, filming was suspended from March to May 2020  and filming started again in June 2020  until the filming finished in mid-September. There were 106 production queues in 2020 while filming. Post-processing and adding CGI took more than 5 months to finish.

Original soundtrack 

 "Rak hai thuengthisut" (รักให้ถึงที่สุด) by Pawee Kochaphakdi
 "Rak hai thuengthisut" (รักให้ถึงที่สุด) by Suppapong Udomkaewkanjana
 "Hak tao lai" (ฮักต้าวหลาย) by Apiwat Boon-Anek, Leew Ajareeya Prompruek
 "Yapyoen" (ยับเยิน) by Khempoom Phothichai
 "Mi thoe talotpai" (มีเธอตลอดไป) by Thanachai Ujjin, Waruntorn Paonil, Pativate Utaichalurm
 "Mai mo mai som" (ไม่เหมาะไม่สม) by Natnat Hirunsomboon
 "Lyong Lyo" by Zack Tabudlo (Philippines)
 "Selamanya Ada" by Aviwkila (Indonesia)

Reception 
Let's Fight, Ghost has been praised for the story-line being adapted to fit to Thai culture, including communicating the culture of Thai food in each episode, and was able to tear down the adage that the presentation of Thai ghost films emphasizes horror and superstition. Effects work and CGI have also been praised.

The ratings were able to be in the Top 10 TV Show in Thailand on Netflix from the first week and in the Top 10 in Thailand on Netflix from the second week, with a score of 7.7 in IMDB After a retrospective count, the program has been viewed on TrueID more than 4.5 million times. In addition, after all 16 episodes were aired in Thailand on April 22, 2021, it became available to stream on Netflix Asia from April 23, 2021. The program was available to stream on Netflix Europe, America and Latin America on April 22, 2021.

Awards and nominations

References

External links 

 Let’s Fight Ghost คู่ไฟท์ไฝว้ผี

2021 Thai television series debuts
Television series about ghosts
Television shows about exorcism
Television shows based on South Korean webtoons
Thai romantic comedy television series